De Veenhoop is a village in Smallingerland municipality in the province of Friesland, the Netherlands. It had a population of around 245 in January 2017.

History 
The village was first mentioned between 1851 and 1855 as De Veenhoop, and means "place where peat is excavated". De Veenhoop developed in the late 19th century at the intersection of the Polderhoofdkanaal and the Grietmansrak as a peat excavation village.

Nature 
The Petgatten de Feanhoop is a nature area on the edge of De Alde Feanen National Park. The  area of lakes and swamp forest attracted a large variety of bird life, and is a protected area since 1996.

Gallery

References

External links

Populated places in Friesland
Smallingerland